This is a list of cities, boroughs, and communities along the Schuylkill River in the state of Pennsylvania, United States.

The default sort in the following table is from the source downstream to the Delaware River.

 Tamaqua is a borough along the Little Schuylkill River

See also
List of crossings of the Schuylkill River
List of Pennsylvania rivers

 
Schuylkill
Schuylkill
Cities, Schuylkill